253 (North Irish) Medical Regiment is a regiment of the Royal Army Medical Corps within the Army Reserve of the British Army.

History
The regiment was originally formed as the 253 (North Irish) Field Ambulance, upon the formation of the TAVR in 1967. In 2006, under the Delivering Security in a Changing World reforms, the field ambulance was re-designated as a medical regiment, becoming 253 (North Irish) Divisional General Support Medical Regiment. Under Army 2020, the regiment dropped the divisional title, to become 253 (North Irish) Medical Regiment, transferred to 2nd Medical Brigade, and was tasked to support 1st (United Kingdom) Division.

Under the Future Soldier programme, the hospital will amalgamate with 204th (North Irish) Field Hospital to form the new 210th (North Irish) Multi-Role Medical Regiment by 2023.  The new regiment will fall under 2nd Medical Group.

Current Structure
The regiment's current structure is as follows:
Headquarters Squadron, at Belfast
107 Medical Squadron, at Belfast
108 Medical Squadron, at Limavady and Enniskillen
109 Medical Squadron, at Belfast
110 Medical Squadron, at Belfast
 64 Medical Squadron, at Chorley

References

Units of the Royal Army Medical Corps
Military units and formations established in 1967